KJB may refer to:

 The Authorized King James Version of the Bible
 KJB: The Book That Changed the World, a 2011 docudrama film
 Q’anjob’al language, a Mayan language spoken in Guatemala and Mexico
 Ketanji Brown Jackson, Associate Justice of the Supreme Court of the United States